Gholamreza Naalchegar (born 19 April 1958) is a retired Iranian forward who played for the Iran national football team in 1980 AFC Asian Cup and Iran national under-20 football team in 1977 FIFA World Youth Championship. He  played for Esteghlal Tehran most of his football career.

References

External links
 
 Reza Naalchegar at TeamMelli.com

Iran international footballers
Iranian footballers
Esteghlal F.C. players
Living people
1958 births
Association football forwards
1980 AFC Asian Cup players
Mohammedan SC (Dhaka) players